Marcus Windhager (born 16 May 2003) is a professional Australian rules footballer playing for the St Kilda Football Club in the Australian Football League (AFL). He was drafted in the 2021 AFL Draft at pick number 47 overall.

Early life 

Windhager was a promising basketballer as a junior, and at 15, represented Australia in the 2018 FIBA Under-15 Oceania Basketball Championships, averaging 9.2 points, 3.7 rebounds and 3.2 assists across the tournament collecting a gold medal in their final against New Zealand.

As a junior footballer, Windhager finished second in the SMJFL 2019 Under 16s Division One goalkicking table with 23 majors from 10 games playing for Beaumaris, including a bag of 11 against Bentleigh.

Windhager was a member of St Kilda's Next Generation Academy, a pathway for indigenous and multicultural footballers who are typically under-represented and clubs incentivised with draft concessions. He was also an AMC Next Generation Academy Indigenous Scholarship holder.

Windhager was selected for Vic Metro in the 2021 Under 19 National Carnival and played an impressive 25-disposal game in a trail match against Vic Country. He then kickied a goal and had 12 disposals and three inside-50s in the U19 Championships game at Windy Hill in July. Windhager was tipped to be a top 30 pick at the 2021 draft, but suffered a back injury late in the year. Windhager also played for the Sandringham Dragons.

AFL career 

At the 2021 AFL draft, St Kilda matched a bid by Geelong with draft points for Windhager, and ultimately took him with pick 47 overall. Windhager made his AFL debut in 2022 in Round 4 against Hawthorn. In the later half of 2022, Windhager was used as a tagger on players such as Tim Kelly and Cameron Guthrie, and in round 22 received a Rising Star nomination for keeping  player and Brownlow medallist Lachie Neale to 16 disposals, while collecting 21 touches himself.

References

External links

Living people
2003 births
St Kilda Football Club players
Sandringham Dragons players
Indigenous Australian players of Australian rules football
Australian rules footballers from Melbourne